Vue des Alpes (el. 1282 m.) is a high mountain pass in the Jura Mountains in the canton of
Neuchâtel.

It connects La Chaux-de-Fonds and Neuchâtel. The pass road has a maximum grade of 10 percent.

A road tunnel for the motorway has greatly reduced the traffic over the pass. At about 1,050 metres above sea level, it is the third highest motorway in Switzerland.

As implied by its name, the pass provides a panoramic view of the Swiss Alps on a clear day.

See also
 List of highest paved roads in Europe
 List of mountain passes
 List of the highest Swiss passes

References

Mountain passes of Switzerland
Mountain passes of the Jura
Mountain passes of the canton of Neuchâtel